Khelan Ram Jangde (15 July 1946 – 30 April 2021) was an Indian politician. He was elected to the Lok Sabha, lower house of the Parliament of India as a member of the Indian National Congress.

References

External links
Official biographical sketch in Parliament of India website

1946 births
2021 deaths
India MPs 1984–1989
India MPs 1991–1996
Lok Sabha members from Madhya Pradesh
Indian National Congress politicians